Petra Rampre was the defending champion, but lost in the first round to Taylor Townsend.

Townsend went on to win the tournament, defeating Yulia Putintseva in the final, 6–1, 6–1.

Seeds

Main draw

Finals

Top half

Bottom half

References 
 Main draw

Audi Melbourne Pro Tennis Classic - Singles